The Saint Francis Red Flash football program is a college football team that represents Saint Francis University in the Northeast Conference, a part of the NCAA Division I Football Championship Subdivision (FCS).

The current coach is Chris Villarrial who first took the position for the 2010 season.

Key

Head coaches
The following are the head football coaches of the team since founding in 1892.

 † Teams fielded, but records destroyed in fire
 ‡ Records missing

References

Saint Francis

Pennsylvania sports-related lists